Rebbo or Horvat Rebbo (lit. "Rebbo ruins"), alternative spellings: Robbo, Ribbo; in Arabic Khurbet Rubba (lit. "Rubba ruins"), is an ancient site in Israel, mentioned by Eusebius in his Onomasticon as possibly referring to a site by a similar name in the Book of Joshua.

The site is quite extensive and contains tunnels believed to have been in use during the Bar Kokhba revolt. Tombs from the Second Temple period, agricultural features and cisterns (now covered with iron gratings) can be seen on the site. Many lentisk mastic trees (Pistacia lentiscus) and buckthorns (Rhamnus lycioides) cover the site.

In ancient sources 
The site's current name was fixed by the Government Naming Committee in Israel.

Archaeological surveys

Victor Guérin (1863) 
French explorer, Victor Guérin, visited the site, which he called Khirbet Rebba, in 1863, and wrote of his impressions of the site: "The ruins are fairly large and cover the summit and slopes of a hill. Many cisterns and vaults embedded in the rock attest to its great antiquity. The houses, of very small dimensions, were for the most part constructed of medium-sized and generally well squared stones; they litter the ground everywhere with their debris. An edifice, also overthrown from top to bottom, seems to have been a church, which proves that, in the Christian era, this town was still inhabited. Six sections of mutilated columns lie in this place. I also notice, on a beautiful rectangular block, two carved Greek crosses."

Conder and Kitchener (1878) 
The ruin appears in Conder and Kitchener's 1878 Survey of Palestine map under the name Khurbet Rubba. They noted under "Rabba" that it was a "city of Judah, mentioned with Kirjath Jearim (Joshua XV. 60). In the Onomasticon a place called Rebbo is mentioned as east of Eleutheropolis, which might be the same. A good-sized ruin named Rubba is found in the low hills south of the valley of Elah, north-east of Bayt Jibrin, which would be in a suitable position for the early Christian site." They found there "Caves, cisterns, and heaps of stones, ruined walls, bases of pillars and shafts much worn, two lintel stones with crosses, both measuring about 7 feet by 2½ feet."

Aapeli Saarisalo (pre-1931) 
The site was surveyed by Finnish archaeologist A. Saarisalo in the early 20th century, who concluded that the village was inhabited as late as the Byzantine and Early Arab periods.

Gallery

Notes

References

Bibliography

External links 
Survey of Western Palestine, Map 21:    IAA, Wikimedia commons
Archaeological Survey at Tel Rebbo (2018), by Eitan Klein, Boaz Zissu, and Amir Ganor (Hebrew)

Ancient villages in Israel
Former populated places in Israel
Tells (archaeology)
Hebrew Bible cities
Archaeological sites in Israel